The diffuse supernova neutrino background (DSNB) is a theoretical population of neutrinos (and anti-neutrinos) cumulatively originating from all of the supernovae events which have occurred throughout the Universe.

Sources
An individual supernova will release as many as  neutrinos, which is detectable as a short burst of events on Earth provided that the supernova occurred close by enough: Within our own galaxy or one of its satellite galaxies, the only current example of which is SN1987A.

Predicted detections
Theoretical predictions for the flux of the DSNB on Earth are difficult as they depend on many different parameters and assumptions e.g. the rate of supernovae events in the Universe as a function of time, the star formation rate, and the neutrino spectrum from each supernova. However even given these uncertainties the DSNB flux should not be more than an order of magnitude below the current experimental bound, and so will be detectable in the near future.

See also 

 Cosmic neutrino background

References

Supernovae
Neutrino astronomy